XHTAO-TDT channel 14 (virtual channel 6) is a Multimedios Television affiliate in Tampico, Tamaulipas.

Before the analog shutdown, XHTAO's audio signal could be heard at 87.7 MHz on FM radios, though at a slightly lower volume than other FM stations, due to technical reasons. After the analog shutdown, this couldn't be possible due to the nature of digital TV.

Programming
XHTAO broadcasts a large amount of local programming, including local editions of Multimedios's flagship news program Telediario.

The digital station began operations on August 1, 2012.

XHTAO has one digital repeater, in Gustavo Garmendia, San Luis Potosí.

In March 2018, in order to facilitate the repacking of TV services out of the 600 MHz band (channels 38-51), XHTAO was assigned channel 14 for continued digital operations. The change was carried out in September 2018.

Digital television
The station's digital signal is multiplexed:

References

External links
Multimedios TV website 

Television stations in Tampico, Tamaulipas
Canal 6 (Mexico)